This is a list of lighthouses in Ascension Island.

Lighthouses

See also
 Lists of lighthouses and lightvessels

References

External links
 

Ascension Island
Lighthouses
Transport buildings and structures in Saint Helena, Ascension and Tristan da Cunha